In the UK, CEOs of charities are compensated for their time, and the data of which is available in the public domain. In comparison to the private sector, the compensation of charity CEOs is generally substantially lower. For example Steve Robertson of the privatised Thames Water, which serves water to 10,000,000 people, received a fixed salary of £745,000 in 2018, with potential bonus of £3,750,000 in 2020.  For a public-sector comparison, UK prime minister David Cameron received a salary of £142,500 in 2015. 

The table below outlines financial data - CEO salaries and turnover figures - where available, of a selection of major charities in the United Kingdom, by capital.

Data for 2001 and 2002 is available on The Guardian's website

The below table shows the inflation-adjusted, equivalent value of 100 British pounds in 2017, for previous years. It is sourced from Bank of England website:

References 

Charities based in the United Kingdom 

Charities based in Scotland 

Charities based in Northern Ireland 

Charities based in England
Charities based in Wales
Charities based in England and Wales